The Arcadia Football Clubs Association (Ένωση Ποδοσφαιρικών Σωματείων Αρκαδίας = Enosi Podosfairikon Somateion Arkadias) is a football (soccer) organization in Arcadia that is part of the Greek Football Federation.

Its headquarters is located in the subregional capital city of Tripoli and the organization has about 50 clubs.  Basic organizations of the union is local soccer championships into three divisions and the Arcadia Cup, in which teams from local divisions, and body-member of clubs playing in the higher divisions.

The winner of the first division used to head to the National Fourth Division. As of 2012–13, the winner of the first division plays vs. three other prefectures in a 6-game home and away playoff with the winner of that after-season tournament advancing to Football League 2 (Greece).

The cup winner of Arkadia participates into the Greek Amateur Cup.

for many years, there were three divisions. As of 2012–13, there is no third division as the second division is composed of two groups. At the end of the season, the winner of each second division group plays the second place team of the other group to determine who gets promoted to the first division.

The union also organizes matches for the youth and adult competition, women take part in the Arcadia FCA Mixed Competition which plays games with other mixed associations and organizations.

The association awards each year a reward to the greatest scorer and the Characteristic Cup in teams with the highest points "fair play" of each category

Divisions (2010–11)
The 2010–11 season features the following teams:

Premier Division

Second Division

Teams in higher divisions

In the 2018–19 season, the following clubs from Arcadia took part in higher divisions:

Super League:
Asteras Tripolis
Third Division:
Panarkadikos

References
This article incorporates text from the Equivalent article in the Greek Wikipedia.

External links
http://www.epsarkadias.gr 

Sport in Arcadia, Peloponnese
Association football governing bodies in Greece